Threads is the nineteenth album by Battlefield Band and their thirteenth studio album, released in 1995 on the Temple Records label.

Track listing
 "In and out of the Harbour/The Top Tier/Sleepy Maggie/Molly Rankin" – 3:37
 "The Arran Convict" – 4:26
 "Snow on the Hills/Xesus and Felisa" – 3:17
 "Tramps and Hawkers" – 5:47
 "My Home Town/Kalabakan" – 3:43
 "The Weary Whaling Ground" – 4:10
 "Miss Kate Rusby" – 3:57
 "The Same Old Story" – 4:45
 "Simon Thoumire's Jig/Shake a Leg/Ríl Gan Ainm" – 3:56
 "MacPherson's Lament" – 5:23
 "Tam Bain's Lum/The Price of the Pig/Isabelle Blackley" – 4:52
 "The Indian Lass" – 4:52

Personnel

Battlefield Band
Alan Reid
Iain MacDonald
Alistair Russel
John McCusker

Sources and links
 

Battlefield Band albums
1995 albums